is a Japanese magical girl anime television series consisting in 25 episodes. It was directed by Takeshi Tamiya and Masayuki Akehi, and it was first broadcast on TV Asahi (then NET) in 1973. Based on an original story by Shinji Nagashima and Hiromi Productions, the series featured character designs by Kazuo Komatsubara and scripts by Masaki Tsuji. It is the sixth of Toei Animation's original majokko (magical girl) anime series, although, as with Cutie Honey, the title character's powers are derived from science rather than magic.

The series was given the time slot on NET (TV Asahi) traditionally reserved for past Toei majokko shows, replacing Cutie Honey, which had been planned for that time slot but was retooled as a more shounen-oriented series. Limit-chan suffered from low ratings during its original broadcast run in Japan but became a mainstream hit some years later in Italy under the title Cybernella.  Despite its relative lack of popularity in Japan, the series was rerun on NET/TV Asahi five times through 1978 and twice on TVK.

The title character's nickname, Limit (her real name is Satomi), comes from the series' original proposal, in which she was given a time limit of one year to live after her accident. Thinking this idea too grim, Hiromi Productions and Toei retooled the series as a traditional magical-girl slice-of-life drama with the added element of the character being a cyborg rather than human.

Plot summary

Satomi Nishiyama (nicknamed "Limit") is the daughter of Dr. Nishiyama. One year she was mortally wounded during a plane crash which also kills her mother. Her father was able to revive her, by making her a cyborg.

As a cyborg she is gifted with “Miracle Powers” and accessories that aid her in solving problems. Her red beret can be used as a radio to contact her father, and her boots have super speed. She is also able to transform with her pendant. Limit-chan has a robot pet dog named Guu.

Limit keeps her cybernetic powers a secret, as she fears being shunned by society. She keeps to herself and sometimes keeps distance from others. Her secret is only known by her father and his assistants. 

Limit is voiced by Youko Kuri.

Characters

 Satomi ("Limit") Nishiyama (西山 理美 / リミット, Nashiyama Satomi / Rimitto) — The title character of the series, revived as a cyborg by her father, Dr. Nishiyama, at the brink of death after an airplane accident that killed her mother.  She is eleven years old, in grade five, and is well-liked by most of the other students in her class. She lives as close to a normal life as she can, keeping the fact that she is a cyborg a secret. She is insecure about her place in society and wishes she were human. Her father has granted her special powers and items with which she helps her friends solve problems. She is voiced by Youko Kuri.
 Dr. Nishiyama (西山 博士 / Nishiyama-hakase) — Limit's father, a genius of cyborg sciences.  He is voiced by Hidekatsu Shibata.
 Tomi-san (トミさん) — The Nishiyama family's live-in housekeeper and nanny to Limit. She lived in Hawaii for 38 years and can speak English as well as Japanese. She is voiced by Masako Nozawa.
 Guu (グー, Gū) — Limit's robot dog, made as a replacement for the real dog who was killed in the plane crash that injured Limit and killed her mother. He has an excellent sense of smell and is powered by a solar battery, which causes him to become very tired when no sunlight is available. He is voiced by Sachiko Chijimatsu.
 Midori Yumoto (湯本 みどり, Yumoto Midori) — Dr. Nishiyama's assistant, secretary, and love interest. She is the only other person aside from the doctor who knows that Limit is a cyborg. In the original series proposal, she was to marry Dr. Nishiyama and become Limit's stepmother, but the anime's early cancellation forced a different ending. She is also voiced by Sachiko Chijimatsu.
 Nobuko Asami (浅見 信子, Asami Nobuko) — Limit's best friend, a bespectacled girl who wears her hair in twin pigtails. Often called Buko for short, she is a tomboy and occasionally jealous of Limit. She is voiced by Keiko Yamamoto.
 Tomoo Asami (浅見 友男, Asami Tomoo) — Buko's younger brother. He is voiced by Yoshiko Yamamoto.
 Boss (ボス, Bosu) — The class bully (his real name is Ryūta Ishibashi / 石橋 隆太, Ishibashi Ryūta).  However, he is all talk and something of a coward and will usually try to talk his way out of fights. He is jealous of Limit's popularity. He is voiced by Kaneta Kimotsuki. He has a younger sister named Ayako (voiced by Kaoru Ozawa and Sachiko Chijimatsu) whom Tomoo has a crush on. He has two sidekicks, Yosaburo (voiced by Masako Nozawa) and Ichiyen (voiced by Shunji Yamada).
 Mitsuko Takeshita (竹下 光子, Takeshita Mitsuko) — A snobby, popular transfer student who becomes Limit's rival for class supremacy. She is voiced by Rihoko Yoshida and Sachiko Chijimatsu, and is always accompanied by a clique of hangers-on.
 Ms. Otohime (乙姫 先生, Otohime-sensei) — Limit's homeroom teacher. Her real name is Keiko Suzuki (鈴木 圭子, Suzuki Keiko) but is nicknamed "Ms. Otohime" for her good looks. She is strict but friendly. In the final episode, she reveals to Limit that she is leaving her teaching job to marry Mr. Sakata. She is voiced by Akiko Tsuboi.  
 Mr. Sakata (坂田 先生, Sakata-sensei) — Limit's strict physical education teacher. His real name is Kintoki Sakata (坂田 金時, Sakata Kintoki). He and Ms. Otohime get engaged in the final episode. He is voiced by Kouji Yada.

Limit's Powers

Limit's Miracle Powers can be activated with a click of the dial on her special pendant. She has Miracle Power, which gives her superhuman strength; Miracle Jump, which allows her to jump unusually high; and Miracle Run, with which she can outrun a car at full speed.  With her pendant, she can also transform into whatever she wants by saying the phrase "Change Face" and transforms back to her normal self by saying "Change back!"

She has been given seven magical tools which aid her in helping her friends solve problems. In addition to her pendant, she has a shoulder bag equipped with wings enabling her to fly; her red beret, which she can use as a walkie-talkie of sorts to contact her father; her red boots, which enable her to dance; magical lip balm with which she can write messages; a compact which shines light; a coin purse which keeps Limit's money safe by enabling the money to fly away when a thief tries to steal it; and a flower ring which emits a hypnotic, aromatic fragrance.

Episode List

References

External links
 
 

1973 anime television series debuts
1974 anime films
Toei Animation television
TV Asahi original programming
Magical girl anime and manga
Cyborgs in television